Thung Chang is a district (amphoe) in the northern part of Nan province, northern Thailand.

History
Thung Chang District dates back to the Khwaeng Khun Nan (ขุนน่าน), which was converted into the district Lae (และ) in 1914. In 1961 it was renamed Thung Chang, as the district office had been moved to tambon Thung Chang.

Geography
Neighboring districts are, from the east clockwise, Chaloem Phra Kiat, Pua, Chiang Klang and Song Khwae of Nan Province. To the north is Xaignabouli of Laos.

The eastern part of the district is in the Luang Prabang Range of the Thai highlands.

Climate

Administration

Central administration 
Thung Chang is divided into four sub-districts (tambons), which are further subdivided into 40 administrative villages (mubans).

Local administration 
There are two sub-district municipalities (thesaban tambons) in the district:
 Ngop consisting of sub-district Ngop.
 Thung Chang consisting of parts of sub-districts Lae and Thung Chang.

There are three sub-district administrative organizations (SAO) in the district:
 Pon consisting of sub-district Pon.
 Lae consisting of parts of sub-district Lae.
 Thung Chang consisting of parts of sub-district Thung Chang.

References

External links

amphoe.com (Thai)
http://www.thungchang.com (Thai)

Thung Chang